Esther Desviat Ponce (born 27 January 1982 in Madrid) is a Spanish athlete specialising in the middle-distance events. She represented her country at one outdoor and three indoor World Championships. She won the 800 metres bronze at the 2003 European U23 Championships.

Competition record

Personal bests
Outdoor
800 metres – 2:00.76 (Lausanne 2003)
1500 metres – 4:11.79 (Castellón 2009)
3000 metres – 9:44.68 (Arganda del Rey 2014)
Indoor
800 metres – 2:02.52 (Seville 2003)
1000 metres – 2:41.04 (Madrid 2005)
1500 metres – 4:10.64 (Valencia 2009)
3000 metres – 9:20.59 (Valencia 2010)

References

RFEA profile

1982 births
Living people
Spanish female middle-distance runners
World Athletics Championships athletes for Spain
Athletes from Madrid
Athletes (track and field) at the 2005 Mediterranean Games
Mediterranean Games competitors for Spain
21st-century Spanish women